Frederick Freeman may refer to:

 Freddie Freeman (Frederick Charles Freeman, born 1989), American-Canadian baseball player
 Frederick Norton Freeman (1839–1867), co-founder of Theta Chi fraternity